Beverly Township is one of twenty-two townships in Adams County, Illinois, USA. As of the 2020 census, its population was 354 and it contained 162 housing units.

Geography

Unincorporated towns
 Beverly
 Chestline
 Kingston
(This list is based on USGS data and may include former settlements.)

Cemeteries
The township contains seven cemeteries: Allen Family, Old Beverly, Kingston, Mayfield Family, Mixer Family, Mound Prairie and Rubart.

Major highways
  Illinois State Route 104

Demographics
As of the 2020 census there were 354 people, 112 households, and 94 families residing in the township. The racial makeup of the township was 96.33% White, 0.56% African American, 0.28% Native American, 0.00% Asian, 0.00% Pacific Islander, 0.56% from other races, and 2.26% from two or more races. Hispanic or Latino of any race were 1.41% of the population.

There were 112 households, out of which 41.10% had children under the age of 18 living with them, 83.93% were married couples living together, 0.00% had a female householder with no spouse present, and 16.07% were non-families. 16.10% of all households were made up of individuals, and 8.00% had someone living alone who was 65 years of age or older. The average household size was 2.48 and the average family size was 2.77.

The township's age distribution consisted of 21.6% under the age of 18, none from 18 to 24, 37.4% from 25 to 44, 12.3% from 45 to 64, and 28.8% who were 65 years of age or older. The median age was 42.0 years. For every 100 females, there were 86.6 males. For every 100 females age 18 and over, there were 94.6 males.

The median income for a household in the township was $88,182, and the median income for a family was $100,208. Males had a median income of $48,958 versus $28,611 for females. The per capita income for the township was $29,845. About 24.5% of families and 24.8% of the population were below the poverty line, including 41.7% of those under age 18 and none of those age 65 or over.

School districts
 Griggsville-Perry Community Unit School District 4
 Liberty Community Unit School District 2

Political districts
 Illinois' 18th congressional district
 State House District 93
 State Senate District 47

References
 
 United States National Atlas

External links
 List of Adams County township trustees
 City-Data.com
 Illinois State Archives

Townships in Adams County, Illinois
Populated places established in 1849
Townships in Illinois
1849 establishments in Illinois